The Muskingum River Navigation Historic District is a  historic district in Ohio's Coshocton, Morgan, Muskingum, and Washington counties, which was listed on the National Register of Historic Places in 2007.  The listing includes 12 contributing buildings, 32 contributing structures, and a contributing site.

The "Muskingum River lock system was designated the first Navigation Historic District in the United States by the National Park Service." The Muskingum River Navigation System was also designated as a National Historic Civil Engineering Landmark by the American Society of Civil Engineers in 2001.

It is traversed by the Muskingum River Water Trail.

References

Canals in Ohio
National Register of Historic Places in Coshocton County, Ohio
National Register of Historic Places in Morgan County, Ohio
National Register of Historic Places in Muskingum County, Ohio
National Register of Historic Places in Washington County, Ohio
Historic districts on the National Register of Historic Places in Ohio
Buildings and structures completed in 1816
Historic Civil Engineering Landmarks